Only one vessel of the United States Navy has been named USS Wilmington, after the city of Wilmington, Delaware, although the name was intended for two others.

 The only completed  was Gunboat No. 8, commissioned in 1897, renamed Dover in 1941, and continuing in service until 1945.
 What was to be the second , a  light cruiser, was completed as the  light aircraft carrier .

See also
CSS Wilmington, a casemate ironclad built for the Confederate States Navy

United States Navy ship names